The 1971 British League Division Two season was the second tier/division motorcycle speedway in Great Britain.

Summary
The league continued with 17 teams in its fourth season despite Reading Racers moving up to Division One and two teams dropping out because there were three new entrants to the league. Doncaster Dragons disbanded for good, with the promotion and some of the riders moving to Birmingham and reformed the Birmingham Brummies, who had last raced in 1957. The Crayford Highwayman also dropped out and the Middlesbrough Teessiders changed their name to Teesside Teessiders. Birmingham were one of the new entrants along with Hull Vikings and Sunderland Stars. Hull had last seen league speedway in 1949 and Sunderland in 1964.  

Eastbourne Eagles won their first title since their 1959 Southern Area League success. Despite losing their leading rider Dave Jessup to division 1, the Eastbourne Eagles triumphed by bringing in new signing Malcolm Ballard to support the Kennett brothers Gordon and Dave.

Final table

British League Division Two Knockout Cup
The 1971 British League Division Two Knockout Cup (sponsored by the Speedway Express) was the fourth edition of the Knockout Cup for tier two teams. Ipswich Witches were the winners of the competition for the second successive year.

First round

Second round

Quarter-finals

Semi-finals

+ rained off, tie awarded to Ipswich

Final
First leg

Second leg

Ipswich were declared Knockout Cup Champions, winning on aggregate 92–64.

Leading final averages

Riders' final averages
Berwick

Doug Wyer 9.69 
Maury Robinson 7.97 
Andy Meldrum 7.24 
Alistair Brady 7.03 
Peter Kelly 5.77
Alan Paynter 5.42
Bobby Campbell 4.75
Jim Beaton 4.14
George Beaton 3.36

Birmingham

George Major 8.90 
Terry Shearer 8.40
Archie Wilkinson 6.27
Chris Harrison 6.08
Malcolm Corradine 5.47
Cliff Emms 5.45
Ian Wilson .4.65
Gunther 'Hec' Haslinger 4.41

Boston

Arthur Price 8.92
Jim Ryman 8.32 
Carl Glover 7.27
Russ Osborne 6.65
Jack Bywater 6.48
Tony Featherstone 6.04 
Vic Cross 5.39
Ray Bales 5.28
Graham Jones 2.50

Bradford

Alan Knapkin 10.17
Alf Wells 9.02
Dave Baugh 8.49
Dave Schofield 7.54
Robin Adlington 7.13
Sid Sheldrick 5.15
Alan Bridgett 4.82
Brian Murray 4.43
Peter Thompson 4.35
Stan Dewhurst 1.91

Canterbury

Ross Gilbertson 8.93
Graham Banks 8.03
Dave Piddock 6.75
Graeme Smith 6.32
Graeme Stapleton 6.29
Phil Pratt 6.09
Ted Hubbard 5.44
Bob Tabet 4.76
Barney Kennett 4.09
John Hammond 4.00
Mike Barkaway 2.84

Crewe

Phil Crump 8.98
John Jackson 8.32
Dai Evans 7.72 
Jack Millen 6.61
Ian Bottomley 6.48
Barry Meeks 5.71
Garry Moore 5.31
Dave Parry 5.21

Eastbourne

Malcolm Ballard 8.74 
Gordon Kennett 8.70
Dave Kennett 7.49
Laurie Sims 7.10
Reg Trott 6.99
Roger Johns 6.89
Bobby McNeil 6.82
Mac Woolford 6.67

Hull

Reg Wilson 9.69 
Tony Childs 9.22 
George Devonport 7.71
Colin Tucker 6.20
Robin Amundson 5.94
Dennis Wasden 5.14
Pete Boston 4.47
Ian Bottomley 4.39
Peter Baldock 3.29

Ipswich

John Louis 11.31
Tony Davey 9.93
Pete Bailey 8.20 
Peter Prinsloo 5.25
Clive Noy 5.10
Ron Bagley 5.01
Ted Howgego 4.85
Ted Spittles 4.32
Stan Pepper 3.70

Long Eaton

Malcolm Shakespeare 9.80 
Roger Mills 9.41
Geoff Bouchard 8.26
Gil Farmer 4.42
Peter Wrathall 4.42
Phil Whittaker 4.36
Steve Bass 3.77
Ian Champion 3.45
Gerry Scott 2.47

Peterborough

Andy Ross 9.02
Richard Greer 7.95 
Roy Carter 6.73
John Davis 5.85
Joe Hughes 5.81
John Stayte 5.59 
Alan Witt 5.51
Pete Saunders 5.47
Brian Clark 5.13

Rayleigh

Hugh Saunders 9.41 
Geoff Maloney 7.38
Bob Young 6.67
Allen Emmett 6.44
Nigel Rackett 6.38
Dingle Brown 5.93
Terry Stone 4.65
Dave "Tiger" Beech 4.33

Rochdale

Alan Wilkinson 10.08
Peter Collins 9.80 
Paul Tyrer 7.92
Ken Moss 5.41
Graham Drury 5.40
Colin Goad 4.69
Robbie Gardner 4.66
Terry Kelly 4.27
Paul Callaghan 2.51
Clive Johnson 2.34

Romford

Kevin Holden 8.94
Bob Coles 8.06
Brian Foote 8.00
Stan Stevens 6.60
Mike Sampson 6.14
Mike Vernam 6.11
Colin Sanders 5.78
Charlie Benham 5.22
Ian Gills 4.78
Terry Shearer 4.59
Bruce Edgar 3.00

Sunderland

Russ Dent 8.16
George Barclay 7.21
John Goodall 6.43
Peter Wrathall 4.92
Alan Mackie 4.42
Brian Whaley 4.13
John Lynch 4.05
Gerry Richardson 4.00
John Knock 3.83

Teesside
 
Bruce Forrester 8.33
Tim Swales 7.04
Dave Durham 7.00
Bob Jameson 6.31
Terry Lee 6.09
Frank Auffret 5.92
Pete Reading 5.45
Tony Swales 4.97
Dene Davies 4.62
Mick Moore 4.46

Workington

Malcolm MacKay 9.81
Taffy Owen 8.60
Lou Sansom 7.87
Ken Vale 5.89
Dave Kumeta 4.92
Kym Amundson 4.71
Bernie Hornby 4.32
Geoff Penniket 4.15
Chris Blythe 3.93
Steve Watson 3.57

See also
List of United Kingdom Speedway League Champions
Knockout Cup (speedway)

References

Speedway British League Division Two / National League